Melanella breviuscula is a species of sea snail, a marine gastropod mollusk in the family Eulimidae. The species is one of a number within the genus Melanella.

References

External links
 Dunker, W. (1875). Ueber Conchylien von Desterro, Provinz Sta. Catharina, Brasilien. Jahrbücher der Deutschen Malakozoologischen Gesellschaft. 2: 240–254
 Souza L.S. de & Pimenta A.D. (2019). Taxonomy of littoral Melanella (Gastropoda: Eulimidae) from Brazil, with comments on the Eulima described by Verrill and Bush (1900). Marine Biodiversity. 49(1): 425-442

breviuscula
Gastropods described in 1875